Széphalom may refer to:

Széphalom (Budapest), city part of Budapest District II (Pesthidegkút)
Széphalom (Sátoraljaújhely), city part of Sátoraljaújhely